Peter Daou (born 1965) is a Lebanese-American political strategist, activist, musician and author who has advised major political figures, including Hillary Clinton and John Kerry. He was described by The New York Times as "one of the most prominent political bloggers in the nation." The Washington Post said that his early work in digital politics helped innovate "a whole new way of campaigning."

Early life 
Daou was born and raised in Beirut during the Lebanese Civil War. At 15, he claims he was conscripted by the Lebanese Forces, a Christian militia, and underwent three years of military training alongside his schooling. He attended the American University of Beirut, and amid ongoing strife in Lebanon, moved to New York to study philosophy at New York University. Daou's father was Catholic and Daou was baptized into his father's faith. Daou is of Jewish descent on his mother's side; his mother is an American who was born and raised in New York.

Career

Music 
During the 1990s, Daou was a producer and keyboardist, appearing on hundreds of remixes and recordings by artists including Björk, Frankie Knuckles, Miles Davis, Mariah Carey, and Diana Ross. A jazz pianist, he produced three #1 Billboard Club singles and was signed to Columbia Records and Universal Music Group. He toured the U.S. and Europe, and was featured in Vibe, Spin, Billboard, and Time. Daou also formed The Daou, a New York City-based dance music group.  He and then-wife Vanessa Daou made a number of albums together in the latter part of the 1990s.

Politics 
Daou was an online communications adviser to the John Kerry 2004 presidential campaign. He led Hillary Clinton's digital operation in her 2008 campaign and was an outspoken Clinton advocate in 2016.

During the 2020 primaries, Daou penned a widely-shared op-ed for The Nation in which he implored Democrats, progressives, and leftists to table their 2016 differences and avoid a fight over the candidacy of Bernie Sanders. In November 2019, he appeared on the Sanders campaign "Hear the Bern" podcast in support of the #NotMeUs movement. In March 2020, he explained on The Intercept his support for Sanders and insights gained from past experience working for the Democratic Party's establishment.

In 2019, Daou and his wife, Leela, became advisors to the progressive congressional campaigns of Lindsey Boylan (NY-10), Lauren Ashcraft (NY-12), Rebecca Parson (WA-06), and Melanie D'Arrigo (NY-03).

In April 2020, Daou and his wife formally left the Democratic Party and are both currently unaffiliated with any political party.

On February 14, 2022, Daou posted a tweet where he denounced capitalism and stated that he considers himself a non-specific "leftist". However, he views David Graeber as an influence and sympathizes with Anarchism

Media 
Daou served as the chief executive of Shareblue Media and the co-founder of the media platform Verrit, which was shut down in 2018.

Daou and James Boyce claimed to have performed a founding role in the Huffington Post and said they were shut out of any profits from its sale to AOL. A suit was filed in 2010 by Daou and Boyce, which was settled in 2014.

Daou is the author of Digital Civil War: Confronting the Far-Right Menace.

References

External links 
 

1965 births
American bloggers
American chief executives
American jazz pianists
American male bloggers
American people of Jewish descent
American political activists
American record producers
American University of Beirut alumni
Lebanese emigrants to the United States
Living people
New York (state) Democrats
New York University alumni